Midway is an unincorporated community in Rapides Parish, Louisiana, United States.

Notable residents
Louisiana singer Jay Chevalier was reared in Midway in the late 1930s and 1940s.

References

Unincorporated communities in Rapides Parish, Louisiana
Unincorporated communities in Louisiana